Middle Township can refer to the following places in the United States:

Middle Township, Franklin County, Arkansas, in Franklin County, Arkansas
Middle Township, Hendricks County, Indiana
Middle Township, New Jersey

Township name disambiguation pages